North Prairie is the name of the following places in the United States of America:

North Prairie, Minnesota
North Prairie, Wisconsin
North Prairie Township, North Dakota